Manoor  is a village in the southern state of Karnataka, India. It is located in the Udupi taluk of Udupi district in Karnataka.

Demographics
 India census, Manoor had a population of 5716 with 2683 males and 3033 females.

See also
 Udupi
 Districts of Karnataka

References

External links
 http://Udupi.nic.in/

Villages in Udupi district